Chrozophora is a plant genus of the family Euphorbiaceae first described as a genus in 1824. It comprises monoecious herbs or undershrubs. The genus is widespread across Europe, Africa, and Asia.

Chrozophora tinctoria produced the blue-purple colorant "turnsole" used in medieval illuminated manuscripts and as a food colorant

Species
 Chrozophora brocchiana - Sahara and Sahel regions of Africa; Cape Verde
 Chrozophora gangetica - India
 Chrozophora mujunkumi - Uzbekistan
 Chrozophora oblongifolia - E Africa, Middle East, India, Pakistan
 Chrozophora plicata - Sub-Saharan Africa, Arabian Peninsula, India, Pakistan, Thailand, Myanmar, Java
 Chrozophora rottleri - Indian Subcontinent, Afghanistan, Indochina
 Chrozophora sabulosa - Arabian Peninsula, Iran, Pakistan, Central Asia, Xinjiang
 Chrozophora sabulosa - W Africa
 Chrozophora tinctoria - Mediterranean, Middle East, India, Pakistan, Central Asia

Formerly included
moved to other genera (Codiaeum and Mallotus)
 C. mollissima - Mallotus mollissimus 
 C. peltata - Codiaeum peltatum

References

Chrozophoreae
Euphorbiaceae genera